The Bezirk Schwerin was a district (Bezirk) of East Germany. The administrative seat and the main town was Schwerin.

History
The district was established, with the other 13, on 25 July 1952,  substituting the old German states. After 3 October 1990, it was disestablished due to the German reunification.  Most of the Bezirk Schwerin became part of the state of Mecklenburg-Vorpommern, with the exception of the district of Perleberg, which went to Brandenburg and Amt Neuhaus, which went to Lower Saxony in former West Germany.

Geography

Position
The Bezirk Schwerin bordered with the Bezirke of Rostock, Neubrandenburg, Potsdam and Magdeburg. It bordered also with West Germany.

Subdivision
The Bezirk was divided into 11 Kreise: 1 urban district (Stadtkreise) and 10 rural districts (Landkreise): 
Urban district : Schwerin.
Rural districts : Bützow; Gadebusch; Güstrow; Hagenow; Ludwigslust; Lübz; Parchim; Perleberg; Schwerin-Land; Sternberg.

References

Schwerin
Former states and territories of Mecklenburg-Western Pomerania
20th century in Mecklenburg-Western Pomerania
Schwerin